Khurram Hussain Agha (born 18 October 1976) is an international Pakistani amateur snooker player. A former Asia number three, he was ranked number one in the Pakistan Snooker Rankings for more than half of the decade 2000–2010.

Achievements
 2001 Pakistan national champion
 2002 Pakistan National Championship runner-up
 2002 IBSF World Snooker Championship (last 16)
 2002 Pakistan Latif Masters runner-up
 2003 Pakistan Latif Masters champion
 2004 Pakistan national champion
 2006 Pakistan national champion
 2006 Pakistan Latif Masters runner-up
 2006 IBSF World Snooker Championship (qualifying)
 2006 ASIAN Games

References

External links
Khurram Hussain Agha Profile

Pakistani snooker players
1976 births
Living people
Cue sports players at the 2010 Asian Games
Cue sports players at the 2006 Asian Games
Cue sports players at the 2002 Asian Games
Place of birth missing (living people)
Asian Games competitors for Pakistan